Mario Opazo (born 1969)  is a Colombian video, installation and performance artist. He was born in Tomé, Chile and became a political exile after Pinochet came to power.

Opazo was one of a number of artists exhibiting within the Istituto Italo-Latino Americano display in Palazzo Zenobio within the 2007 Venice Biennale.

Mario Opazo's work is repreasented in the collections of the Museo Extremeño e Iberoamericano de Arte Contemporáneo (MEIAC) in Badajoz and Museum of Latin American Art (MOLAA) in Long Beach, CA.

Notes

External links 
Mario Opazo (his own site) 
CV until 1994 

Colombian performance artists
Chilean performance artists
Video artists
Installation artists
1969 births
Living people